Boparai village comes under the Nadala development block of Kapurthala.  Kapurthala is a district in the Indian state of Punjab.

About 
Boparai lies on the Bholath-Bhogpur Road.

It is located near Bholath and it is about 16 km from Kartarpur and about 32 km from Jalandhar.

There are two Gurudwara Sahib:
 Gurudwara Shri Guru Hargobind Sahib Ji, an historical gurudwara;
 Gurudwara Baba Handal Ji;

Post code 
Boparai's postal code is 144622.

References 

Villages in Kapurthala district